"One Last Breath" is a song by American rock band Creed. The band's lead vocalist, Scott Stapp, wrote the song over a period of three weeks and recorded at J. Stanley Productions Inc in Ocoee, Florida. The lyrics of the song are about reflecting on past mistakes and seeking comfort from friends who want to help. It was released in April 2002 as the third single from their third studio album, Weathered (2001).

The song reached number six on the US Billboard Hot 100, becoming their fourth and final top-10 hit. It also reached number five on the Mainstream Rock chart and Billboard Hot 100 Airplay, number four on the Mainstream Top 40 chart, and number two on the Adult Top 40 chart. Worldwide, the song peaked at number 43 in Australia, number 29 in New Zealand, number 47 in the United Kingdom, where the song was released as a double A-side with "Bullets", and reached number 41 on the Irish Singles Chart.

Writing and recording
Prior to recording the Weathered album, Creed had agreed that during the tour for Human Clay that no new songs could be written, so that the band members could "live life and have experiences". The band also agreed that they would not listen to any music between the ending of the Human Clay tour and the start of writing sessions for Weathered, so as not to allow any other music to subconsciously influence the band's writing process and to ensure that all the songs came completely from them. "One Last Breath" was written within a three-week period along with all the other material from the album, which was done primarily in Scott Stapp's living room during four-hour sessions, as well as on his Sea Ray cruiser.

The song was recorded and mixed at J. Stanley Productions Inc. recording studio in Ocoee, Florida, during the mid to late 2001 using Pro Tools.

Music and lyrics
According to Stapp, the song is about someone crying out for help and realizing the mistakes they've made in their past, as well as being able to lean on one's friends and keeping them close. Stapp also expresses sentiments about how in the minds of "normal, well-adjusted" people, any thoughts of moving beyond this life are not real, and how these surreal thoughts are just flashes-in-the-pan and they would never act upon them.

As with all of Creed's songs, the music was written by guitarist Mark Tremonti. The song is written in the key of D major, with Tremonti playing in standard E tuning and Stapp singing in his traditional baritone with his vocal range spanning from A3-B5. Tremonti stated in an interview with Songfacts that the song contains one of his favourite guitar lines and musical compositions that he ever wrote.

Release and reception
Released on April 15, 2002, as the third single from Weathered, the song was a chart success both in the United States and internationally. "One Last Breath" gave Creed their fourth and final top-10 hit on the US Billboard Hot 100, spending a total of 34 weeks on the chart and peaking at number six on the week of September 28, 2002. The song also reached number five on the Billboard Mainstream Rock chart, number four on the Mainstream Top 40 chart, and number two on the Adult Top 40 chart. Internationally, the song peaked at number 43 in Australia and number 29 in New Zealand. In the United Kingdom and Ireland—where the song was released as a double A-side with "Bullets"—it peaked at number 47 on the UK Singles Chart and number 41 on the Irish Singles Chart. It also charted in Germany, peaking at number 89.

Music video

The video was directed by Dave Meyers who had previously directed the video for "What If", "With Arms Wide Open" and "My Sacrifice", and would go on to co-direct the video for the bands next single Don't Stop Dancing along with Stapp. Stapp drafted the treatment for the video and explained his ideas to Meyers. They soon found out they both had a shared love and affection for Salvador Dalí, a Spanish painter known for his surrealist artwork. Most of the video was shot against a green screen with computer-generated animations to create the setting in which the band performs in as well as the otherworldly visuals.

On the day of the shoot, Stapp was involved in an automobile accident. On April 19, 2002, around 1:40 in the afternoon, Stapp, while driving his Cadillac SUV on Interstate 4 in Florida was struck from behind by a Ford SUV. According to Stapp, the vehicle was going at "probably 50 or 60 miles per hour". Stapp was sent flying forward in his vehicle, with his body hitting the steering wheel and his head hitting the windshield. Stapp, concerned about the wellbeing of the person who hit him, got out of his vehicle to check on the other driver. Although initially the officer on the scene reported no injuries, Stapp soon realized he had not gone unscathed while calling his manager after the accident. He had suffered a concussion from the whiplash and from hitting the windshield. Stapp claims that the police on the scene didn't note any injuries in their report because he refused to call an ambulance or go to the hospital.

Due to prior commitments with director Dave Meyers, Stapp managed to show up to shoot the video the very next day where shooting began at 6:00 a.m. Actress Dawn Cairns, who appeared in the "My Sacrifice" video, also makes an appearance as the woman crying bloody tears into a bowl. The band flew her in from Argentina where she had just finished a shoot two days earlier. Beginning to feel the effects of the accident, Stapp had to be medicated during the shoot to deal with the pain in his head. neck and spine and was also suffering from a headache. A doctor and a masseuse were on site during the shooting of the video and a body double was used for certain scenes Stapp was unable to complete. Stapp was limited in the video as he mainly just stood and sang with little movement or gesticulation. Meyers told Stapp during the shoot that his facial expressions from the pain actually helped in getting the emotion of the song to come across better and noted that he could tell Stapp was in terrible pain during the last shot of the video.

After the shooting was completed, Stapp's pain continued to worsen, and after an MRI on his neck and back it was revealed that the extent of his injuries were worse than once thought. Doctors discovered he had a bulging disk between two vertebrae in his neck and a smashed disk in his lower back. An adjacent missing disk from a congenital condition likely worsened the situation.

Appearances in media
On September 16, 2014, "One Last Breath" was made available as downloadable content as part of the "Creed 5-Song Pack" for the video game Rocksmith 2014 along with "Higher", "My Own Prison", "My Sacrifice" and "With Arms Wide Open".

Track listings

UK CD single
 "One Last Breath" (radio version)
 "Bullets" (album version)
 "I'm Eighteen"
 "One Last Breath" (video)

UK DVD single
 "Bullets" (video)
 "What If" (two-minute video clip)
 "Torn" (audio)
 "One Last Breath" (audio)

European CD single
 "One Last Breath" (radio version) – 3:58
 "Is This the End" – 6:15

Australian and New Zealand CD single
 "One Last Breath" (radio version) – 3:58
 "Is This the End" – 6:15
 "My Own Prison" (acoustic extended version) – 5:03
 "One Last Breath" (video) – 3:59

Charts

Weekly charts

Year-end charts

Release history

References

2001 songs
2002 singles
Creed (band) songs
Epic Records singles
Music videos directed by Dave Meyers (director)
Songs written by Mark Tremonti
Songs written by Scott Stapp
Wind-up Records singles